The Optare Sigma was a step-entrance single-deck bus body manufactured by Optare between 1994 and 1996 on the Dennis Lance chassis. The body was constructed from Alusuisse aluminium alloy with fiberglass front and rear panels. It was the single-deck version of the Optare Spectra.

The Sigma was not a low-floor bus although its floor height of 40cm is considered low for a step-entrance design. The first built had two doors, the remainder only one. It was also similar in design to the Optare Delta. The Vecta had the same body styling as the Sigma but was designed for medium-length chassis, the Sigma was for full length chassis.

Only 54 were produced, primarily being purchased by Brighton & Hove (20), Trent Barton (17) and Gateshead & District (14).

Unlike the Spectra, it did not last long enough to be developed into a true low-floor bus and was replaced by the Optare Excel in 1995.

References

External links

Sigma
Vehicles introduced in 1994